Leon Michael Lillie (born June 1961) is an American politician serving in the Minnesota House of Representatives since 2005. A member of the Minnesota Democratic–Farmer–Labor Party (DFL), Lillie represents District 44B in the Twin Cities metropolitan area, which includes the cities of Oakdale, North St. Paul, and Maplewood and parts of Ramsey and Washington Counties.

Early life, education and career
Lillie graduated from North High School in North Saint Paul, then attended the University of Nottingham in Nottingham, England and at Luther College in Decorah, Iowa, earning his B.S. in Political Science. He served on the North Saint Paul City Council from 1995–2004. He is also an airline employee.

Minnesota House of Representatives
Lillie was first elected to the Minnesota House of Representatives in 2004, defeating DFL incumbent Scott Wasiluk in a primary after Wasiluk was caught on video drinking alcohol in his Capitol office, and has been reelected every two years since. 

Lillie served as vice chair of the Commerce and Labor Committee during the 2009-2010 legislative session. From 2013-2014 he served as an assistant majority leader. Since 2019 Lillie has served as chair of the Legacy Finance Division, which oversees the allocation of proceeds from a state sales tax increase passed in 2008. Those funds are designated to protecting drinking water and wildlife habitat as well as preserving arts and cultural heritage. Lillie also sits on the Capital Investment, Rules and Legislative Administration, and Ways and Means Committees.

Electoral history

Personal life
Lillie is married and has three children. His brother, Ted Lillie, a Republican, was a member of the Minnesota Senate from 2011-12.

References

External links 

 Rep. Lillie Web Page
 Minnesota Public Radio Votetracker: Rep. Leon Lillie
 Project Votesmart – Rep. Leon Lillie Profile
 Leon Lillie Campaign Web Site

1961 births
Living people
People from North St. Paul, Minnesota
Democratic Party members of the Minnesota House of Representatives
American Lutherans
Luther College (Iowa) alumni
Alumni of the University of Nottingham
21st-century American politicians